Katula (also Romanized as Katūlā) is a village in Shalil Rural District, Miankuh District, Ardal County, Chaharmahal and Bakhtiari Province, Iran. At the 2006 census, its population was 78, in 13 families.

References 

Populated places in Ardal County